Piagapo, officially the Municipality of Piagapo (Maranao: Inged a Piagapo), is a 4th class municipality in the province of Lanao del Sur, Philippines. According to the 2020 census, it has a population of 30,132 people.

History
The municipality was named Piagapo as the word relates closely to several royal houses of the Pat A Pangampong a Ranao. It is believed that during the ancient time, Piagapo was territorial land originally ruled by a queen ruler “Dayang Labi", a direct descendant of Sharief Kabungsuan, the first Muslim missionary who landed in Maguindanao to spread the religion Islam. Being queen ruler of the land, she was popularly enthroned and widely known as the “Bai sa Radapan”. Furthermore, to retain her name and legacy in the history of Piagapo, one of the Barangays was named after her title as the Bai sa radapan. It was called Radapan. This is the place where most of her descendants reside. Moreover, claimants of the sultanate leadership in the different areas of Piagapo usually trace up their genealogical origin from the progenitor, the Bai sa Radapan. Only her progeny can claim a royal title. The Municipality of Piagapo was once a component of the Municipality of Saguiaran, Lanao del Sur. On March 17, 1957, the president signed Executive Order No. 431 creating Piagapo into a municipal district which took effect effectively. The name Piagapo was proposed by a group of leaders from Sendigan led by Sultan a Diamla and presented by Mangompia S. Gunting. The name Piagapo was unanimously adopted as the name of the municipal district. Piagapo was then converted into a regular municipality on July 1, 1965, by virtue of Executive Order No. 166 signed on August 27, 1965. Piagapo also divided into three districts: Sundigan A Piagapo, Pat a Panoroganan, Bubonga Marantao and composed of 37 barangay.

Martial Law

Piagapo is one of the municipalities suffered and receiving evacuees from municipality of Munai and municipality of Tangcal during Martial Law in 1972.
Almost Evacuees living in Munai at the time were abandoned their home, livestock, land, etc. and they moved to boundary somewhere in Lanao del Sur and Lanao del Norte.
Most of the people stay meanwhile to Barangay Lininding of Munai, a boundary of Municipality of Piagapo, Lanao del Sur. The only remaining people that time of evacuation process were the Moro (Male and Female including Children) Fighter and one of their Leader Commander was Commander Tagoranao "AKA James Bond" Macapaar bin Sabbar, a MNLF Top Commander for Lanao del Norte. Late Commander James Bond is the sibling of MILF Top Commander Abdullah Macapaar "Commander Bravo". Moro Rebels from Munai had a fight side by side with the Moro Rebels from neighboring Tangkal against Philippines Constabulary (PC) Army.

After peaceful was process in the middle of 1980s, the team of MILF Commander Sultan Saifudin Romandiar Tomawis and MILF Commander Sultan Tagoranao Goldiano Macapaar bin Sabbar along with the MILF Commander Sansarona from Maguindanao had stay and made a temporary "MILF Camp Bansayan" in Bansayan, a barangay of Piagapo until end of EDSA Revolution on 1986. During the stay, there were enormous battle between MILF forces and Government Forces. Both MILF Commanders had gone to Afghanistan to join the war against Russian on 1984. The said Camp was abandoned by MILF Soldiers when civilian had given the map and provide with guide the Government Forces when that MILF Camp on early EDSA Revolution. On the Attack of Government Forces, they come secretly at night in barangay bansayan and they stay at the near of the MILF Camp Bansayan for almost 10hrs until 3:00AM and strike the Camp. The one of the Field Commander who stay long and withdraw later to fight is Commander Abiden Dimacuta Umpar because he handle .30 Machine Gun.

Geography
It is located in the first district of the province of Lanao del Sur, Autonomous Region in Muslim Mindanao (ARMM) and has total land area of 340.09 square kilometers distributed over the 37 barangays that are predominantly populated by Maranao people.

Barangays
Piagapo is divided into 3 districts and composed of 37 barangays.

Bubonga Marantao
 Aposong
 Bubo
 Bualan
 Bubonga Ilian
 Bubonga Mamaanun
 Bubonga Tawaan
 Ilian Proper
 Ilian Poblacion
 Lumbaca Mamaanun
 Mamaanun
 Mentring
 Palao
 Paling
 Paridi
 Pindolonan
 Rantian
Sapingit

Pat A Panoroganan
 Bangco
 Basak
 Gacap
 Katumbacan
 Olango
 Pantaon
 Pantar
 Radapan Poblacion
 Radapan Proper
 Tambo
 Tapocan
 Tawaan

Sundigan A Piagapo
 Bagoingud
 Bansayan
 Kalungnan
 Lininding
 Palacat
 Talao
 Taporug
 Udalo

Terrain and Natural Resources
The area is hilly and mountainous with scattered plain areas suitable for agricultural activities. These plain portions are either upland or lowland. It is rich in natural resources such as wide vast of forest area with varieties of good trees, rivers, springs and streams that have good potentials for further development. However, the local government unit should pay attention on the issues regarding illegal logging and kainging otherwise the community would be prone to erosion and landslides that will endanger many lives. The natural resources of the Municipality especially its wide and diverse forest should be protected and preserved.

Climate

Piagapo being part of Lanao del Sur has predominantly cold climate. The climate observed in the community is very unpredictable where rainfalls are mostly observed during the month of July, August, September and October. Dry season is observed during summer the month of March, April and May. The Municipality is hilly and mountainous. The beautiful mountains with vast trees in the area serve as natural barriers against typhoon and strong wind and other natural calamities.

Demographics

The Municipality of Piagapo is a Muslim area that is predominantly populated by Maranao tribe who are culturally bounded people. Its people, majority of which, do not accept birth control, birth spacing and other methods. They believe it is against their religious belief. However, majority of them learned to accept other health intervention particularly to maintain and improve health status. This belief and value of the people of Piagapo had caused an increase in its population from time to time. This is revealed by the different census conducted by NSO in different year. The latest and current population of the municipality as distributed to its 37 barangays is 21,974 as shown in the table below. The average household size is 3.78 or 4 persons per household. But based on 2007 census of population, Piagapo has 5,417 household and the average household size is 6.42.

Population growth rate
The population of Piagapo varies according to the different population census conducted by the NSO, at an increasing trend. In 1995, its total population was 19,198. It increased by about 4,705 or 24.50% in a span of five years. Hence, the annual growth rate between the 1995 and 2000 was 4.5%. In 2007, another census was conducted by the NSO. That census that revealed that Piagapo's population was increased to 34,792. Between 2000 and 2007, the population increased by 10,889 or 45.5% for a span of 7 years. Hence, the population growth rates is 6.5% annually, which is very high. However, it was somehow unbelievable and unrealistic, that between 2007 and 2010, The population of Piagapo tremendously declined from 34,792 to 21,974 in just a span of 3 years. The decrease was unusual and very abrupt. The constituents of Piagapo could not believe it, even when some of the residents migrated to other areas in the Philippines temporarily after occurrence of the all-out war against the MILF in the previous years.

Economy

Agricultural Products
People of Piagapo are mostly farmers by occupation who generally produce corn, rice as major agricultural products. However, there are few of them who also plant other agricultural products such as trees like mahogany, acacia, and various fruit trees. Vegetables, species and root crops particularly cassava, camote and the like are among the secondary products in the municipality. Due to problem on farm to market road, farmers usually produce mostly for home consumption.

Livestock
Aside from producing agricultural products as the main source of income, some of the residents in the municipality raised carabaos, and cows as working animals. Poultry products such as chicken, duck, and goose are also raised but in limited number and for household consumption only. Raising poultry products is a way of subsidizing the basic needs of the people. Raising livestock like chicken is becoming very discouraging due to lack of knowledge on controlling disease of this livestock. Livestock like carabao and cows are in some cases raised in the community by some well off families, farmers and landlord in limited quantity and mainly as work animal or some times for rent.

Market Outlet
Farm-to-Market road has been a problem almost all over the municipality. Poor road coupled with the absence of Municipal Local Public Market, make it more difficult for the farmers to market their products. The agricultural products are usually marketed either to Saguiaran, Baloi, Lanao del Norte, Pantaoaragat and Iligan City. The decision of the farmers where to market their products is usually dependent on the price offered by the different buyers/middlemen available in the above-mentioned market areas. However, more frequently the price offered is unreasonable. In addition thereto, the expensive transportation cost of products makes farming a losing, discouraging and undesirable low profile venture to the people. Hence, the municipality, in cooperation with other agencies, should give careful attention to these issues and should provide, improve and rehabilitate farm to market road and educate farmers on adoptable agricultural technology and provide a centralized Public Market in a strategic area in the locality where the products of the farmers can be marketed at reasonable fair price and less transportation cost.

Infrastructure

Transportation
The accessibility and the availability of farm to market roads had been for many years the widely known problems of the people of Piagapo especially those residents from the far flung and interior areas of the municipality which usually use horses as the primary mode of transportation. Though some barangays can somehow be reached through land transportation via Saguiaran, through the long winding provincial road that transverse the municipality, and through barangay road extending from Barangay Kabingan, MSU, Marawi City to Barangay Bobo, Piagapo, most areas are still inaccessible. Not all kinds of vehicle can access the area due to the condition of the provincial road and several barangay roads. The provincial road is segmented road. Some parts are cemented while several portions are still earth fill and impassable or inaccessible like TAPORUG, TALAO, KALUNGUNAN, BAGOA INGUD, LININDING, GACAP, BANGCO, and PALACAT especially during rainy season. They usually use horses as the primary mode of transportation.

Availability of electricity
Availability of electric power has been one of the major problems in Piagapo for a very long period of time. While 20 or 50% of the 37 barangays were provided with electricity by LASURECO, it is undeniable that the supply or availability of electricity in the locality is not regular. In fact, 17 barangays (46%) have been dwelling in darkness for a long period of time and had been longing and very eager to avail to such basic service while the rest are asking for its sustainability. Just recently, last August 2013, the municipality is totally in darkness, no electricity in the whole area of Piagapo. The irregularity of electric power in the municipality does not only hamper the development of the area but also slow down and seriously affect the performance and delivery of some services of the LGU. Moreover, the connection or installation of electric wiring has to be improved to avoid accidents and unwanted events relative to electricity.

Education
The Department of Education (DepEd) has been exerting effort and great investment to address the needs for quality education and make it available on a vastly wider scale to develop those potentials. Presently, DepEd has the following number schools of different levels addressing the needs for quality education. The municipality of Piagapo is among the depressed areas that are confronted with problems on illiteracy. Illiteracy problem has been obvious in the area which is one among the major factors that hampers development.

Government
The municipal hall of Piagapo is situated at Barangay Bobo, the first barangay to be reached from Saguiaran, Lanao del Sur, with an area of 11,270 square meter.

Elected officials 2022-2025:
 Municipal Mayor: Ali L. Sumandar
 Vice Mayor: Norombae Manalocon- Sumandar
 Sangguniang Bayan:
 Abubacar L. Sumandar
 Mosatafa D. Panganting
 Mano L. Acoon
 Suhaylah M. Mulok
 Macacuna M. Banisil
 Samanuddin M. Bazer
 Shamil M. Campong
 Samsodin M. Mamao
 ABC President: Camarudin M. Mulok
 SK President : Hafsha Junayya L. Mangompia
 SB Secretary: Nasser B. Lumabao

List of former Chief Executives

Mayors under the 5th Republic

References

External links

 Piagapo Profile at the DTI Cities and Municipalities Competitive Index
 [ Philippine Standard Geographic Code]
 Philippine Census Information
 Local Governance Performance Management System

Municipalities of Lanao del Sur
Establishments by Philippine executive order